Spotted Tail (Siŋté Glešká  pronounced gleh-shka; birth name T'at'aŋka Napsíca "Jumping Buffalo" ); born c. 1823 – died August 5, 1881) was a Brulé Lakota tribal chief. Although a great warrior in his youth, and having taken part in the Grattan massacre, he declined to participate in Red Cloud's War. He had become convinced of the futility of opposing the white incursions into his homeland; he became a statesman, speaking for peace and defending the rights of his tribe.

He made several trips to Washington, D.C. in the 1870s to represent his people, and was noted for his interest in bringing education to the Sioux. He was shot and killed by Crow Dog, a Brulé Lakota subchief, in 1881 for reasons which have been disputed.

Early years
Spotted Tail was born about 1823 in the White River country west of the Missouri River in present-day South Dakota. His father, Cunka or Tangle Hair, was from the Saône band, and his mother, Walks-with-the-Pipe, was a Brulé. He was given the birth name of Jumping Buffalo. During the previous 40 years, the Lakota or Teton Sioux had moved from present-day Minnesota and eastern South Dakota to areas west of the Missouri. They had differentiated into several sub-tribes or bands, including the Saône, Brulé and Oglala. During this time the people adopted the use of horses and expanded their range in hunting the buffalo across their wide grazing patterns.

The young man took his warrior name, Spotted Tail, after receiving a gift of a raccoon tail from a white trapper; he sometimes wore a raccoon tail in his war bonnet. He took part in the Grattan Massacre. Two of his sisters, Iron Between Horns and Kills Enemy, were married to the elder Crazy Horse, in what was traditional Sioux practice for elite men. Spotted Tail may have been the maternal uncle of the famous warrior Crazy Horse, which meant he was a relative of the notable Touch the Clouds as well.

General Anson Mills, who knew Spotted Tail well, called him "a fine-looking man, with engaging manners, perfectly loyal to the government, a lover of peace, knowing no good could come to his people from war," a man who had both a high respect for and confidence in U.S. Army officers as well as a good sense of humor.

Marriage and family

Spotted Tail married and had children. Eugene Fitch Ware, a Fort Laramie army officer, wrote that Spotted Tail's daughter, Ah-ho-appa (Fallen Leaf), "... was one of those individuals found in all lands, at all places, and among all people; she was misplaced."  He suggested that she adopted some European-American practices, and that she was thought to be secretly in love with one of the officers at the fort. When she was dying in 1866, Fallen Leaf made her father promise that she would be buried on a hillside overlooking Fort Laramie.  The entire garrison at the post helped Spotted Tail to honor her request by arranging for a ceremonial funeral, including a Christian service and Sioux ceremony. Many years later, Spotted Tail had her remains transported to the Rosebud Indian Agency in South Dakota and re-interred.

Treaty of Fort Laramie

Spotted Tail agreed to the treaty, which in 1868 established the Great Sioux Reservation in West River, west of the Missouri River. In 1871, the senior Spotted Tail visited Washington, D.C. to meet the Commissioner of Indian Affairs Ely S. Parker and President Ulysses S. Grant. While there, he met with Red Cloud, a chief of the Oglala Lakota, and they agreed to work together on preserving Sioux rights and land.

In 1881, following the Black Hills War, Spotted Tail was killed by Crow Dog for reasons that have been disputed. Luther Standing Bear claimed Spotted Tail was killed by Crow Dog for having sold land not belonging to him and for taking the wife of a crippled man. Although these actions are said to have angered many Sioux leaders, Spotted Tail refused to give the woman back, claiming the United States government stood behind him. Several men decided to kill Spotted Tail but, before they could act, he was killed by Crow Dog on August 5, 1881. According to historian Dee Brown: "White officials...dismissed the killing as the culmination of a quarrel over a woman, but Spotted Tail's friends said that it was the result of a plot to break the power of the chiefs."

Prelude to the Great Sioux War of 1876-77

In 1874, George Armstrong Custer led a reconnaissance mission into Sioux territory that reported gold in the Black Hills, an area held sacred by the local Indians. Formerly, the Army tried to keep miners out but did not succeed; the threat of violence grew. In May 1875, delegations headed by Spotted Tail, Red Cloud, and Lone Horn traveled to Washington, D.C. in a last-ditch attempt to persuade President Grant to honor existing treaties and stem the flow of miners into their territories. The Indians met with Grant, Secretary of the Interior Delano, and Commissioner of Indian Affairs Smith, who informed them that Congress wanted to resolve the matter by giving the tribes $25,000 for their land and resettling them into Indian Territory.  The Indians rejected such a treaty, with Spotted Tail's reply to the proposition being as follows:

My father, I have considered all the Great Father told me, and have come here to give you an answer.... When I was here before, the President gave me my country, and I put my stake down in a good place, and there I want to stay.... I respect the Treaty (doubtless referring to the 1868 Treaty of Fort Laramie) but the white men who come in our country do not.  You speak of another country, but it is not my country; it does not concern me, and I want nothing to do with it. I was not born there.... If it is such a good country, you ought to send the white men now in our country there and let us alone....

Death in 1881
On August 5, 1881, after a long simmering feud, Crow Dog shot and killed Chief Spotted Tail on the Rosebud Indian Reservation. Crow Dog was arrested and tried in a territorial court in Deadwood, Dakota Territory, and found guilty of murder and sentenced to hang. In the case of Ex parte Crow Dog, the United States Supreme Court overturned the verdict because the Deadwood Court had no jurisdiction in a case of one Indian killing another on reservation lands. Crow Dog was released and returned to the Rosebud.

Spotted Tail is buried in Rosebud, South Dakota. A tribal university (Sinte Gleska University) on the Rosebud Indian Reservation in South Dakota was named for him in 1971.

Impact on Indian legal jurisprudence
Spotted Tail's death influenced critical Indian law principles, long after his death. The case of Ex parte Crow Dog established that Indian tribes retain their sovereignty. The case also motivated the immediate creation, starting in 1885 of a series of federal statutes laying out the division of power between federal courts and Indian tribal courts to try Indian and non-Indian persons, in different circumstances for different crimes on Indian reservations. However Ex parte Crow Dog also established the plenary powers doctrine, giving Congress the power to pass any law they choose (including laws altering treaties that had been previously entered into), even over the opposition of the tribe or tribes affected.

See also
 Black Hills
 Ex parte Crow Dog

Notes

References

Sources

1820s births
1881 deaths
Brulé people
Murdered Native American people
People of the Great Sioux War of 1876
Lakota leaders
Native American leaders
American frontier
People murdered in South Dakota
Date of birth unknown
Place of death missing
People from Rosebud Indian Reservation, South Dakota
1881 murders in the United States
Deaths by firearm in South Dakota